Several Canadian naval units have been named HMCS Huron.

  was a Second World War  destroyer.
  was an  active from 1972 to 2005.

Battle Honours
 Atlantic, 1943
 Arctic, 1943–1945
 Biscay, 1943–1944
 Norway, 1945
 Korea, 1952–1953

References

Directorate of History and Heritage - HMCS Huron 

Royal Canadian Navy ship names